Hafiz Ahmed is an Indian teacher, poet and social activist of Miya origin.

Early life and education
Ahmed was born in Kapoha in Barpeta on 7 September 1962. He was raised in a traditional Muslim family and his parents' names were Madhu Miah and Somjan Nessa. Ahmed belongs to the Miya community which migrated to Assam from Bengal during the British Raj. He completed his PhD in Assamese literature at the prestigious Gauhati University.

Career
In 2016, he pioneered an Assamese poetic genre known as Miya poetry. He is the chairman of the Char Chapori Literary Council in Assam, which aims to spread the use of the Assamese language to the Miya community. The Miya, who reside in the state's riverine areas, historically conversed in Bengali but are drifting towards Assamese identity and language.

Personal life
Ahmed is the father of two children; Shabnam Hafiz and Safdar Hafiz.

References

Indian male poets
Living people
Poets from Assam
Gauhati University alumni
21st-century Indian Muslims
Indian Muslim activists
Indian Sunni Muslims
Muslim poets
21st-century Indian educators
Indian schoolteachers
Assamese-language poets
21st-century Indian poets
1962 births